The 2020–21 Bellarmine Knights men's basketball team represented Bellarmine University in the 2020–21 NCAA Division I men's basketball season. The Knights, led by 16th-year head coach Scott Davenport, played their home games at Freedom Hall in Louisville, Kentucky as members of the ASUN Conference. They finished the season 14–8 and 10–3 in ASUN play to finish in second place in the conference. They earned the second seed in the ASUN tournament, losing in the quarterfinals to Stetson. They were invited to the College Basketball Invitational (the program’s first ever Division I postseason event), where they defeated Army in the quarterfinals and lost to Pepperdine in the semifinals.

The season marked Bellarmine's first year of a four-year transition period from Division II to Division I. As a result, the Knights were not eligible for NCAA postseason play but were allowed to participate in the ASUN Tournament.

Previous season
The Knights finished the 2019–20 season with a 20–8 overall record, including a 13–7 mark in GLVC play to finish in fifth place. It was a turbulent season for the team to say the least. They began the season 14–0, and had earned a number one overall ranking in the Division II Top 25 polls. After falling at home in a heartbreaking overtime loss to Indianapolis, 81–76, the Knights never quite found their dominant footing again. They lost six of their next eight games, including one to annual GLVC bottom feeder William Jewell. With the losing skid, the Knights fell out of the rankings all together and were faced with a tough climb to even make the NCAA Tournament. They won three of their final four games to close out the regular season. As the 5th seed in the 2020 GLVC tournament, they were defeated by No. 4 seeded Southern Indiana in the quarterfinals, 76–73. They received the 5 seed in the Midwest Region of the NCAA DII tournament. But, like many sporting events, the tournament was cancelled due to the ongoing COVID-19 pandemic.

Roster

Schedule and results
Bellarmine was scheduled to begin their season on November 25 on the road against Chattanooga, but due to "unforeseen circumstances", this game, along with their home opener on November 28 against Transylvania, and their game on December 1 against Dayton, were postponed. Their game against Chattanooga was rescheduled for December 9, at home, and their game against Transylvania was rescheduled for January 1, 2021. Their game against Dayton was canceled.

After a preseason shutdown due to the COVID-19 pandemic, the Knights ended up playing their first game at the Division I level on the road against the sixth-ranked Duke Blue Devils. It was a historic night for the program albeit in a quieter than usual Cameron Indoor Stadium. Despite staying close for the first half, Bellarmine ended up falling short to Duke, 76–54. Junior guard Dylan Penn entered the history books during the game, as he was responsible for scoring the first ever points in Bellarmine’s history at the Division I level.

Two days after the loss to Duke, Bellarmine made a different kind of history for the program, which was undoubtedly more positive. On December 6, 2020, the Knights traveled to the doorsteps of Howard University and dismantled the Bison, 84–63, to notch their first ever win at the Division I level. Sophomore guard Alec Pfriem came off the bench and notched the program’s first ever double-double in Division I, scoring 14 points and grabbing 14 rebounds. The double-double was also the first of Pfriem’s collegiate career.

The Knights entered ASUN play with a 3–3 record, including losses to high-profile ACC opponents in Duke and Notre Dame. After narrowly being swept at home by preseason conference favorite Lipscomb, the Knights got back to playing their brand of basketball. They went on the road and swept Florida Gulf Coast in a dominant two-day set, behind the contributions of senior forward Ethan Claycomb. He was named ASUN Player of the Week, becoming the first Bellarmine athlete in any sport to earn such an honor during the Knights' brief ASUN history.

The Knights continued their success at home in the following weekend against Stetson, pulling off comeback wins on back-to-back nights to extend their winning streak to four. The second win was particularly special, however, as the Knights pulled off an unbelievable comeback. Trailing by 20 with less than 19 minutes to go in the game, Bellarmine shot 84 percent from the field in the second half (21 of 25) en route to rallying past the Hatters for a 76–65 victory.

Bellarmine continued their winning streak over the next few weeks, sweeping Kennesaw State, Jacksonville, and North Alabama to get to a 10–2 record in ASUN play, which placed them at the top of the conference.

|-
!colspan=13 style=| Non-conference regular season

|-
!colspan=12 style=| ASUN Conference regular season

|-
!colspan=12 style=| ASUN tournament
|-

|-
!colspan=12 style=| CBI
|-

Source

References

Bellarmine Knights men's basketball seasons
Bellarmine
Bellarmine Knights men's basketball
Bellarmine Knights men's basketball
Bellarmine